O'Day is a surname of Irish origin. Notable people with the surname include:

Alan O'Day (1940–2013), American singer-songwriter
Anita O'Day (1919–2006), American jazz singer
Aubrey O'Day (born 1984), American singer, dancer, actress, songwriter, fashion designer, former member of the group Danity Kane
Caroline Love Goodwin O'Day (1875–1943), American politician
Constance O'Day-Flannery, an American author of romance novels
Daniel O'Day, one of northwestern Pennsylvania's earliest independent refiners to be brought into John D. Rockefeller's Standard Oil Company
Darren O'Day (born 1982), Major League Baseball relief pitcher for the Atlanta Braves. Real last name Odachowski, not Irish.
George O'Day (1923–1987), American sailor, Olympic champion and boat designer
Hank O'Day (1859–1935), American right-handed pitcher, umpire and manager in Major League Baseball
Jeremy O'Day (born 1974), offensive lineman for the Saskatchewan Roughriders of the Canadian Football League
John O'Day (1856–1933), American politician
Marcus O'Day (1897–1961), American physicist
Molly O'Day (1911–1998), American film actress
Molly O'Day (singer) (1923–1987), American country music vocalist in the late 1940s
Nell O'Day (1909–1989), accomplished equestrian and B-movie actress of the 1930s and 1940s
Pat O'Day (born 1934), Pacific Northwest broadcaster and promoter

See also
Break O'Day Council, a Local Government Area of Tasmania, encompassing the northern part of the states east coast
Javits-Wagner-O'Day Act or JWOD, 41 U.S.C. § 46 et seq
O'Day Corp., a U.S. sailboat builder of the following sailboats:
O'Day 23
O'Day 25
O'Day 28
O'Day 30
O'Day Day Sailer
O'Day Mariner, a long sailboat based upon the hull of the Rhodes 19
O'Day (crater), a prominent lunar impact crater that is located on the far side of the Moon
O'Dea, Irish surname from which O'Day is derived
Peep o' Day Boys, a Protestant secret association in 18th century Ireland, a precursor of the Orange Order

References

Surnames of Irish origin
Anglicised Irish-language surnames